There have been many peerages in the British isles which refer to Richmond.

Richmond in Yorkshire
Honour of Richmond
Earl of Richmond
Duke of Richmond
William Hague, Baron Hague of Richmond
Brenda Hale, Baroness Hale of Richmond
Angela Harris, Baroness Harris of Richmond
Nick Houghton, Baron Houghton of Richmond

Richmond in Greater London
Zac Goldsmith, Baron Goldsmith of Richmond Park
Chris Holmes, Baron Holmes of Richmond
Alan Watson, Baron Watson of Richmond
Patrick Wright, Baron Wright of Richmond

Other
Anthony Royle, Baron Fanshawe of Richmond, of South Cerney in the County of Gloucestershire